Vsevolod Sorokin (Сорокин, Всеволод Кириллович; born October 29, 1993) is a Russian professional ice hockey defenceman who is currently playing for MHk 32 Liptovský Mikuláš of the Slovak Extraliga. 

Sorokin made his debut playing with Spartak Moscow during the 2013 Nadezhda Cup.

References

External links

1993 births
Living people
Atlant Moscow Oblast players
HC Spartak Moscow players
Russian ice hockey defencemen
Ice hockey people from Moscow
MHk 32 Liptovský Mikuláš players
Russian expatriate ice hockey people
Russian expatriate sportspeople in Uzbekistan
Russian expatriate sportspeople in Hungary
Russian expatriate sportspeople in Slovakia
Expatriate ice hockey players in Slovakia
Expatriate ice hockey players in Hungary
Expatriate ice hockey players in Uzbekistan